Sarah Forbes (born January 11, 1973) is a Canadian former field hockey goaltender who played for York University and the Women's Senior National Team.

Early life 
Born in Victoria, British Columbia, Forbes was raised in Fredericton, New Brunswick, and now lives in Sudbury, Ontario. She started playing hockey in 1989 at high school as a field player but changed to goalkeeper. The summer she switched to goalie, her New Brunswick team won the Gold Medal at the Canada Games. From 1991 until 1997, Forbes played with the York University field hockey team, which earned her the Gail Wilson Award for Player of the Year. She was also York University Athlete of the Year in 1998.

Career 
She debuted for the Women's Senior National Team in 1993 for the Junior World Cup in Barcelona, where Canada finished 8th.

Forbes was a paramedic for Toronto EMS for over 15 years and teaches at CTS Canadian Career College. She also works at Laurentian University as their varsity medical coordinator and at Sudbury District Public Health with their Covid-19 Response team. Forbes also worked as an assistant coach for the York University field hockey team from 1999 to 2009 and the University of Guelph from 2010 to 2012.

International senior tournaments
 1994 – World Cup, Dublin, Ireland (10th)
 1995 – Olympic Qualifier, Cape Town, South Africa (7th)
 1997 – World Cup Qualifier, Harare, Zimbabwe (11th)
 1998 – Commonwealth Games, Kuala Lumpur, Malaysia (not ranked)
 1999 – Pan American Games, Winnipeg, Manitoba, Canada (3rd)
 2001 – Americas Cup, Kingston, Jamaica (3rd)
 2002 – Commonwealth Games, Manchester, England (7th)
 2003 – Pan American Games, Santo Domingo, Dominican Republic (5th)
 2004 – Pan Am Cup, Bridgetown, Barbados (3rd)
 2006 – Commonwealth Games, Melbourne, Australia (8th)
 2007 – 2007 Pan American Games, Rio de Janeiro, Brazil
 2008 – 2008 Olympic Qualifier, Victoria (4th)

External links
 Profile on Field Hockey Canada

1973 births
Living people
Canadian female field hockey players
Canadian field hockey coaches
Commonwealth Games competitors for Canada
Field hockey players at the 1998 Commonwealth Games
Field hockey players at the 2002 Commonwealth Games
Field hockey players at the 2006 Commonwealth Games
Field hockey players from Victoria, British Columbia
Sportspeople from Fredericton